Clarice Halligan (17 September 1904 – 16 February 1942) was an Australian nurse and missionary.  During World War II she enlisted in the Australian Army Nursing Service, and while a prisoner of war was killed by the Japanese in the Bangka Island massacre.

Early life
Clarice Isobel Halligan was born in Ballarat, Victoria, on 17 September 1904. The daughter of Joseph Patrick Halligan and Emily Watson Chalmers, she had seven brothers and sisters.

Halligan trained at The Melbourne Hospital and Women's Hospital. She worked for three and a half years at the renamed Royal Melbourne Hospital.

In 1934 she travelled to Papua New Guinea as a missionary, landing in Port Moresby on 31 July.

World War II
On 11 July 1940 Halligan enlisted at the A.A.M.C. Depot in Melbourne for the Australian Army Nursing Service. On 20 December 1940 Halligan joined the 2nd/13th Australian General Hospital serving in Malacca, Malaysia and Singapore following the Japanese advance.

Together with the 65 Australian nurses and over 250 civilian men, women and children evacuated on the Vyner Brooke from Singapore three days before the fall of Malaya. She was injured when the ship was bombed by Japanese torpedoes and sunk in Bangka Strait on 14 February, leaving 22 nurses stranded on Bangka Island in the Dutch East Indies (now Indonesia). The nurses were taken prisoners of war by the Japanese along with 25 British soldiers.

On 16 February the group was massacred. The soldiers were bayoneted and the nurses were ordered to march into the sea at Radji Beach, where they were shot; she was 37 years old.

Awards and honours
Halligan was honoured at the Last Post ceremony at the Australian War Memorial on 9 February 2020. Her memorial is in the Singapore Memorial within Kranji War Cemetery, Augusta Australian Army Nursing Sisters Monument, Australian Ex-Prisoners of War Memorial in Ballarat and Australian Military Nurses Memorial.

See also
 Vivian Bullwinkel, sole surviving nurse of the Bangka Island massacre

References

1904 births
1942 deaths
Australian Army personnel of World War II
Australian prisoners of war
Female wartime nurses
Women in the Australian military
Women in World War II
World War II prisoners of war held by Japan
World War II nurses
Australian military nurses
Australian women nurses
Australian military personnel killed in World War II
20th-century Australian women
Australian Army officers
People executed by Japanese occupation forces